Miles Redd is an American interior designer based in New York City. He studied fashion design at the Parsons School of Design and film at New York University, and served as the creative director of Oscar de la Renta Home from 2003-13. Redd started his own interior design practice in 1998 after honing his skills with antiques dealer John Rosselli and decorator Bunny Williams.

Redd is on Elle Decor's "A-List of Interior Designers," and is a member of Architectural Digest's "AD100," which names "the world’s preeminent architects and designers." His work can be found in decorating and design magazines such as Architectural Digest, House Beautiful, Veranda, and Vogue.

Produced in 2012 with luxury book publisher Assouline, The Big Book of Chic is Redd's first book. Redd’s work has been published in other design tomes, including Inspired Design: The 100 Most Important Designers of the Past 100 Years by Jennifer Boles, Interiors: The Greatest Rooms of the Century by Phaidon Press, and Making Rooms Your Own by Editors of the New York Social Diary.

Redd has appeared in video content including simultaneous house tours of his New York and Fire Island Pines residences for The New York Times T Magazine as well as videos by Architectural Digest and popular decorating blog Quintessence.

The decorator ventured into product design with his fabric, wallcovering, and fabric collection for trade textile house Schumacher, as well as rugs for their sister company Patterson Flynn & Martin. In Fall 2017, Redd partnered with omnichannel retail company Ballard Designs on an extensive collection of furniture, accessories, lighting; and, introduced in 2018, outdoor furniture.

In January 2019, Redd announced his new business partner, David Kaihoi, and renamed his once-eponymous firm Redd Kaihoi. At their office, located in the Manhattan neighborhood of Chelsea, the firm works on residential design projects for an international collection of clients.

Miles grew up in Atlanta, Georgia and graduated from The Lovett School in 1987.

References 

American interior designers
Living people
American LGBT artists
Tisch School of the Arts alumni
Parsons School of Design alumni
People from Atlanta
Year of birth missing (living people)